Kharj is a governorate in central Saudi Arabia. It is one of the important governorates in the Kingdom of Saudi Arabia and is located in the southeast of the capital Riyadh, within an area of 19,790 km2 ~ 4,890,215.5 acres, and a population of 376,325 people, according to the statistics of the General Authority for Statistics for the year 2010. The city of Al Saih is the capital of modern Kharj and its administrative and economic center.

Etymology
  It has also been said that Alkharj means what comes out of the earth because it is an agricultural region since the earliest times, and the name is older than those poets like the poet of King Al-Himyari, Asaad Abi Karb Al-Awsat, who mentioned the name of the Alkharj in their poems.

The Ministry of Transport recently started making some corrective changes to the indicative panels on the roads leading to the city of Al Saih, within the administrative borders of Alkharj governorate and include the entrances to the city of Al Saih, the Riyadh highway, the old Riyadh road, the Haradh road, and the Al Saih-Dalam road, in implementation of the directives issued by the Amir of Riyadh in this regard that emphasizes the necessity of committing to launching the name (the City of Al Saih) in line with the correct name of this city that was launched by the unifier of this country, King Abdulaziz, in the year 1356 Hijri.

History
Al-Kharj, with its historical monuments, is an important destination for researchers and those interested in the history of the Kingdom of Saudi Arabia and of the founder King Abdulaziz. Alkharj has some of the factors that are considered essential for tourism in the Kingdom and need to be considered and sought to achieve them archeology tourism, as there is a feast of archaeological monuments, perhaps the most important of which is the King Abdulaziz Palace. The historical site located in Al-Aziziyah district in the heart of Al-Saih city. It was built in 1359 Hijri in the center of Al-Saih city.

Among the historical palaces abound in Alkharj is "Abu Jafan Palace" located east of the city of Al-Saih, and it was built during the reign of King Abdulaziz in the year 1366 Hijri and the purpose of its construction was to be a place at where those coming from the eastern region and pilgrims to the Great Mosque of Mecca which is still open to visitors.

The city of Dalam, which has a historical value to Alkharj governorate, abounds with many archaeological monuments and witnessed many historical battles represented in a fierce battle between King Abdulalaziz and Ibn Rashid.

The town of Yamama, located in the north of the city of Al-Saih, is one of the oldest towns in the Arabian Peninsula. In the northeastern corner of the town, there locates one of the oldest settlements that is called (Al-Banna), which is part of the old settlement that was found in this place before Islam. A variety of pottery was found on surrounding area of the town which indicates a time settlement that extends from the middle of the third millennium BC. Also, there has been found three pieces of ancient coin on the site, as well as accessories made of silver and bronze.

Geography
There are many valleys that flow into Alkharj. The most important of which are the Hanifa Valley, the Haniyeh Valley and the Al-Sahba Valley. Also, Alkharj is known for the presence of [al-ee-u-oon] which means literally “eyes”, which are cavities inside the earth. these cavities in Al-Kharj, during summer period, are popular with visitors who come to see them from inside and outside the Kingdom, especially citizens of the Gulf Cooperation Council countries. The “eyes” of Al-Kharj are distinguished for a long time by their cold water during the summer and warm during the winter, as these massive wells were flooding with water and running in large quantities like a river in the desert, especially in the valleys that penetrate the city of Al-Saih and which have acquired this name for the flow of water in it  All year round.  Al-Kharj is known that it is a water land where it gained its name since ancient times from the content of its geographical nature, which was characterized by the abundance of its agricultural production, the fertility of its lands and the sweetness of its water, as it has many natural springs that used to supply farms and agricultural projects with water through a group of channels and streams of water.

Ain of al-Dila, a spring, located in the southwest of the city of Al-Saih, is one of the largest “eyes” in the Kingdom, in addition to the presence of many wells and springs with mineral sulfur water, which had an important place since ancient times, the most famous of which are Ain Samha, Ain Umm Kheisa, Ain Al-Dilaand Ain Farzan. These wells have remained the main source of water supplies for all uses in the Alkharj Oasis, and its quantities and levels have started to gradually decrease over the past two decades as a result of increasing the withdrawal and consumption of water from the feeding layer after the expansion of digging artesian wells by farmers, especially major agricultural and animal projects, which in return led to a stoppage of flow Natural in all eyes and the gradual depletion of the deeper eyes, the depth ranges between 5 to 16 meters, then the deepest.

Climate
The climate of Al-Kharj is continental, really hot through the summer and dry cold through the winter plus a low chance of rain. The weather cools down at night in mid-September until the cold becomes more intense in December and January, and the average maximum temperature in winter is 18 °C and the lowest 5 °C, while summer is the average maximum temperature is 48 °C and the lowest of 31 °C.

Economy
Al-Saih is one of the main and active cities in the present and future of the Kingdom of Saudi Arabia, which is the modern capital of Alkharj and its administrative and economic center with a population of more than 376 thousand people.

It is also worth noting what this city is known for in terms of its characteristics and what it possesses of advantages and constituents as it is one of the rich regions with all the economic rectifiers that attract investment and settlement. Not only that but also from natural resources, geographical location and population density, which is undoubtedly factors that give this city a successful environment for investment, if you take advantage of optimal exploitation to create a strong, effective and solid economic entity that will be a tributary of diversification of income sources and support for the national and local income, in addition to creating job opportunities for the promising manpower, especially the auxiliary city of the country's political capital.

The city of Al-Saih is the home to many significant economic and government installations, perhaps the most noted of which are the General Corporation for Military Industries, which is the only military factory in the Persian Gulf, and Prince Sultan Air Base, which is one of the largest air bases in the world, which includes the main supply and supply base for the Saudi army, General of arms and savings and many branches of the various military sectors of the Ministry of Defense.

Alkharj is considered a first-class agricultural region, as it has been and still is a food basket since ancient times, with its diverse agricultural crops. Alkharj is a source of weight for agricultural production as it produces more than 26% of vegetable production in the Kingdom, and embraces the largest companies, farms, dairy factories and Saudi poultry that its products cover the Gulf Cooperation Council countries and Jordan. Some of these companies are the well-respected Almarai company plus Al Safi Danone, Al Azizia, Mazraa Dairy, and Al Kharj Dairy.

The leadership of Alkharj comes back to the dairy industry and related technology for that industry. Alkharj has been crowned as the capital of dairy industry. This is as result of a good seed planted by the unifier of this country, King Abdulaziz, which is the first seed for dairy production in the Kingdom, when his Majesty directed the establishment of the Alkharj Agricultural Project in 1354 Hijri. Currently, Alkharj produces more than 65 percent of the Kingdom's milk production and acquires the largest dairy farms and factories in the Kingdom and the Gulf Cooperation Council Countries. The Chamber of Commerce and Industry in Alkharj organized the first dairy festival under the slogan of "Alkharj is the capital of dairy industry" in the month of Jumada Al-Awwal 1429 Hijri corresponding to May 2008, and is considered the first of its kind in the Kingdom and the first in the Persian Gulf, where it witnessed the popularity and admiration of visitors.

Education
The city is home to a number of state schools, which are fully funded by the government, and public and international schools teaching foreign curricula. The city is also home to Prince Sattam bin Abdulaziz University.

Al-Kharj on the map
Alkharj is one of the important strategic locations on the Saudi map, as it is a crossroads linking it to the rest of the regions in the Kingdom and even neighboring countries. Alkharj is connected by a highway to the capital, Riyadh, and is the first highway in the central region which was established in 1980. This highway through Alkharj links the capital with the Asir region in the south of the Kingdom, then to the Republic of Yemen. There is also a road that links Alkharj with the eastern region, the Gulf Cooperation Council states, Qatar, the United Arab Emirates and Oman. It connects the Arab states of the Persian Gulf with the Asir region and Yemen through the city of Al-Saih, and between Alkharj and Al-Ahsa, which is under expansion. Beside the railway line that runs through Alkharj from Riyadh to the eastern region. There is currently in the city of Al-Saih a freight train station and the weight of trucks and will be transferred to a dry port.

See also

 List of cities and towns in Saudi Arabia
 Regions of Saudi Arabia

References

.

Populated places in Riyadh Province